The Commonwealth Countries League (CCL), founded in 1925 as the British Commonwealth League, is a voluntary pan-Commonwealth civil society organisation. The objectives are to secure equality of liberties, status and opportunities between men and women and to promote mutual understanding throughout the Commonwealth. The CCL is non-party and is open to men and women from all countries. It promotes the education of girls and young women and links together women’s organisations throughout the Commonwealth. In particular it raises money for its associated charity, the Commonwealth Girls Education Fund.

History, Structure and Governance

History 
The CCL grew from the British Commonwealth League, which in turn grew out of the British Dominion Suffrage Union (founded 1914).

The BCL was conceived as an idea in 1923 by a group of women who had been involved in the suffrage movement including Myra Sadd Brown, the League's first Treasurer.  A group of Australian women had come to London to march in the suffrage parades in support of the British suffragettes, their main aim being to support women of any ethnicity, in other Dominions and colonies to get the vote. Women also came from India, the Caribbean, South Africa and other countries. The BCL was established to “promote equality of liberties, status and opportunities between women and men, and to encourage mutual understanding throughout the Commonwealth”. This was formally instituted as the CCL in 1925.

Mission 
The Commonwealth Countries League works for rights and interests of women in the Commonwealth by providing a platform: 
 To exchange knowledge on issues relating to families, women and girls
 To lobby the relevant authorities on those issues
 To focus on friendship and networking between Commonwealth countries
 To facilitate the co-operation between Commonwealth women’s organisations through its affiliates
 To raise funds for the secondary/high school education of girls throughout the Commonwealth

The League's objective is to advance education and civil rights and preserve and protect health throughout the Commonwealth by providing grants, items or services to other charities and / or organisations established to advance education and preserve and protect health. In particular, through the Commonwealth Girls Education Fund, to educate and empower young women as agents of change in their own communities.

Governance 

The CCL is a registered charity run by a Board of Trustees and headed by a Chairman. The charity has a Patron and a President of the Executive Committee is elected every 3 years at the AGM.

 • Patron: Mrs Louisa Service O.B.E., J.P., M.A.(Oxon) 
 • Chairman: Sir Peter Heap K.C.M.G. 
 • President: Duchess Williams-Alonga

Membership 

Membership of the League is open to all with an interest in the aims. There are currently around 500 members, including most of the London-based High Commissioners or their spouses and a broad range of educators and supporters.

Charitable Activities 

The philosophy behind the CCL’s work is that educated girls with a highly developed sense of responsibility are more likely to provide a better future for themselves as well as for their communities. The primary recipient of funds from CCL activities is the Commonwealth Girls Education Fund (CGEF). Sponsorship enables girls, who have academic potential but whose parents or guardians cannot support them financially, to continue their secondary education in their own Commonwealth country. Other funding recipients include rural women’s enterprise support projects in Grenada and Ghana, and a clinic in Tanzania.

Events 

The league raises funds through subscriptions and events, which include afternoon teas, lunches and dinners, often hosted by a High Commission, and fashion shows. The major event of the year is the Commonwealth Fair which is held in November.

See also 

Commonwealth Girls Education Fund

External links 
Commonwealth Countries League official website
Splendours of the Commonwealth 2018
Annual Report 2018/19 of the CCL
Annual Report 2012/13 of the CGEF
The Commonwealth Fair
The Commonwealth Girls Education Fund (CGEF)

References

Commonwealth of Nations